"The Cuckoo" (Roud 413) is a traditional English folk song, also sung in the United States, Canada, Scotland and Ireland. The song is known by many names, including "The Coo-Coo", "The Coo-Coo Bird", "The Cuckoo Bird", "The Cuckoo Is a Pretty Bird", "The Evening Meeting", "The Unconstant Lover", "Bunclody" and "Going to Georgia". Lyrics usually include the line (or a slight variation): "The cuckoo is a pretty bird, she sings as she flies; she brings us glad tidings, and she tells us no lies."

According to Thomas Goldsmith of The Raleigh News & Observer, "The Cuckoo" is an interior monologue where the singer "relates his desires — to gamble, to win, to regain love's affection."

The song is featured in the E.L. Doctorow book The March. A soldier suffering from a metal spike stuck in his head sings verses from the song.

Synopsis
Usually, but not always, the song begins with a verse about the cuckoo, for example:

The cuckoo is a fine bird he sings as he flies,He brings us good tidings and tells us no lies.He sucks the sweet flowers to make his voice clear,And the more he cries cuckoo, the summer is nigh.

(In many American versions, the cuckoo patriotically "never sings 'cuckoo' till the fourth of July". In some ornithologically observant English versions "she sucks little birds' eggs to make her voice clear.")

A young woman (usually - sometimes a young man) complains of the inconstancy of young men (or women) and the pain of losing in love. The song often consists mainly of "floating" verses (verses found in more than one song expressing common experiences and emotions), and apart from the constant cuckoo verse, usually sung at the beginning, there is no fixed order, though sometimes a verse sounds as if it is going to be the start of a story:
A-walking, a-talking, a-walking was I,To meet my true lover, he'll come by and by,To meet him in the meadows is all my delight,A-walking and talking from morning till night. 
but then: 
O, meeting is a pleasure and parting is a grief,An unconstant lover is worse than a thief,A thief can but rob you and take all you have,An unconstant lover will bring you to the grave.

Often there is a cautionary moral:
Come all pretty maidens wherever you be,Don't trust in young soldiers to any degree,They will kiss you and court you, poor girls to deceive,There's not one in twenty poor girls can believe.

Or a more symbolic warning, here in a Mississippi version:
Come all you fair maidens take warning of me,Don't place your affections on a sycamore tree,For the top it will wither, and the roots they will die,And if I'm forsaken, I know not for why.

Bunclody
An Irish song, this uses a similar tune and starts with verses extolling the beauty of Bunclody, a town in Co. Wexford. The third verse is the standard "Cuckoo is a pretty bird" and after an adapted floating verse:
If I were a clerkAnd I could write a good handI would write to my true loveSo that she'd understandThat I am a young fellowWho is wounded in loveOnce I lived in BuncloudyBut now must remove.

The song ends in a sad verse about emigration. There is a fine recording of this song from Luke Kelly of The Dubliners.

Note on the Cuckoo
The cuckoo (Cuculus canorus) was until recent times a common visitor to the English countryside in spring and early summer, and its distinctive call was considered the first sign of spring. It is a nest parasite, and the female really does eat an egg of the host species when she lays her own egg in the nest. It is an important bird in folklore.

The cuckoo has traditionally been associated with sexual incontinence and infidelity. An old name for the cuckoo was "cuckold's chorister", and old broadsides played on the idea that the cuckoo's call was a reproach to husbands whose wives were unfaithful:
The smith that on his anvill the iron hard doth ding:He cannot heare the cuckoo though he loud doth singIn poynting of plow harnesse, he labours till he sweat,While another in his forge at home may steale a private heat.– From The Cuckowes Comendation: / Or, the Cuckolds Credit: Being a merry Maying Song in Praise of the Cuckow., c.1625

History

Early printed versions
"The Cuckoo" was published as a broadside by London and provincial printers, but does not seem to have been common. Broadsides are not precisely dated, but the earliest in the Bodleian Ballad Collection was published between 1780 and 1812 CE, the latest before 1845. The broadside texts are similar, of five verses starting with a "Come all ye" warning about courting sailors and with the cuckoo appearing in the second verse.

Collecting
The Roud Folk Song Index lists about 149 collected or recorded versions performed by traditional singers - 49 from England, 4 from Scotland, 2 from Ireland, 4 from Canada and 88 from the USA.

At least one collected version was published in the Folk Songs from the Kentucky Mountains (1917).

Field recordings
Alan Lomax recorded Jean Ritchie from Viper, Kentucky singing The Cuckoo is a Pretty Bird in New York in 1949.
Hamish Henderson recorded Willie Mathieson from Ellon, Aberdeenshire, singing The Evening Meeting in 1952.
Max Hunter recorded Mrs Norma Kisner of Springdale Arkansas, singing a fragment of Unconstant Lover in 1960.
Max Hunter recorded Olivia Hauser of Fayetteville, Arkansas, singing False Hearted Lover in 1961.

Performers

The first known recording was made by Kelly Harrell for Victor in 1926.

The song has been covered by many musicians in several different styles. In North America, an early notable recorded version was performed in 1929 by Appalachian folk musician Clarence Ashley with an unusual banjo tuning.

Notable artists who have recorded "The Cuckoo" include:

See also

Folk songs with shared motifs and floating verses include:

 Come All You Fair and Tender Ladies
 Jack of Diamonds (song)
 On Top of Old Smoky

Notes and references

English folk songs
American folk songs
Bob Dylan songs
Peter, Paul and Mary songs
Jean Ritchie songs
Year of song unknown
Songwriter unknown